Margarete Maria Pioresan (born 1 January 1956), commonly known as Meg, is a former Brazilian footballer who played as a goalkeeper for the Brazil women's national football team. She represented Brazil at the FIFA Women's World Cup in 1991 and 1995 and played in the 1996 Olympics at the age of 40. Earlier in her sporting career Meg had played for the Brazil women's national handball team, winning a bronze medal at the 1987 Pan American Games.

Career
Meg began playing handball after enrolling at Universidade Estadual de Maringá in 1975 and moved to Rio de Janeiro in 1979 to play handball as a goalkeeper. She was called into the Brazil women's national handball team in 1983.

While in Rio de Janeiro, Meg also took up football and played in goal for EC Radar. After two years playing beach soccer in 1980 and 1981, Radar played on grass from 1982 onwards. Placar magazine reported in 1985 that Meg was earning a salary of 150,000 Cr from Radar. That year she quit football in order to focus on her handball commitments, including playing at the 1987 Pan American Games where Brazil won bronze medals.

Still concentrating on handball, Meg rejected a call–up from the Brazilian Football Confederation (CBF) to play for Brazil at the 1988 FIFA Women's Invitation Tournament. After playing in a tournament in Bulgaria in 1989 Meg concluded her handball career. When she was invited to the 1991 FIFA Women's World Cup, she returned to football—after six years out of the game and at the age of 35—citing her dream of reaching the Olympic Games.

Meg maintained her physical condition by training hard and playing club football for the women's section of CR Vasco da Gama. In the 1995 FIFA Women's World Cup Meg played in Brazil's shock win over hosts Sweden in the opening game. Although defeats to Japan and Germany consigned Brazil to elimination in last place in the group, Meg still achieved her dream of Olympic qualification. World Cup quarter finalists England were ineligible and Brazil had the best record of the teams eliminated in the group stage. Meg had played with a broken finger sustained while saving a penalty from Homare Sawa during the 2–1 defeat to Japan.

Brazil exceeded expectations at the 1996 Olympic Football Tournament, finishing in fourth place. Meg intended to retire after the Olympics but Vasco persuaded her to play on until 2000, using veteran male player Mauro Galvão as an example.

References

External links
 

1956 births
Living people
People from Toledo, Paraná
Women's association football goalkeepers
Olympic footballers of Brazil
Footballers at the 1996 Summer Olympics
1995 FIFA Women's World Cup players
1991 FIFA Women's World Cup players
Brazilian female handball players
Brazilian people of Italian descent
Brazil women's international footballers
Brazilian women's footballers
EC Radar players
Pan American Games bronze medalists for Brazil
Pan American Games medalists in handball
Handball players at the 1987 Pan American Games
Medalists at the 1987 Pan American Games
Sportspeople from Paraná (state)